Cronian is a progressive/avant-garde metal band from Norway and Sweden founded in 2004 by Øystein Brun and Andreas Hedlund, also known as Vintersorg. The band's music is heavily symphonic and programmed, combining melodic singing and harsh vocals, all aiming to create a cold and cinematic feeling.

Biography 
Having known one another for years, Borknagar's main songwriter/guitarist Øystein Brun and Swedish musician Andreas Hedlund realized they had a similar idea for a band since 2000. Originally under the named "Ion", the two musicians began to collaborate, and in 2004 the band finally started gaining force. In 2005 the music of the band now known as Cronian was finalized and released, and in 2006 they released their first full-length album, entitled Terra. The album was mastered by famed musician and producer Dan Swanö, and released by Century Media Records as the first release in a three-record deal.

Members 
Andreas Hedlund  (a.k.a. Vintersorg) – vocals, bass, keyboard (2004–present)
Øystein Brun – guitar, drum programming (2004–present)

Discography 
 Terra (Century Media, 2006)
 Enterprise (Indie Recordings, 2008)
 Erathems'' (2013)

References

External links 
 Cronian on Myspace

Norwegian avant-garde metal musical groups
Norwegian progressive metal musical groups
Musical groups established in 2004
2004 establishments in Norway
2004 establishments in Sweden
Century Media Records artists
Season of Mist artists
Heavy metal duos
Swedish heavy metal musical groups
Musical groups from Norway with local place of origin missing 
Musical groups from Sweden with local place of origin missing